The Cold is the tenth album by the thrash metal band Flotsam and Jetsam. It was released on 14 September 2010. It was engineered & mixed by Ralph Patlan. The album artwork was created by Travis Smith.

This album has a more progressive metal approach than previous albums. The use of more technical syncopation and rhythms is prevalent throughout. Odd time signatures and elements of technical death metal are used as well.

Track listing
All tracks by Flotsam and Jetsam

Personnel 
 Eric "A.K." Knutson – vocals
 Ed Carlson-guitars
 Jason Ward – bass guitar
 Mark Simpson – guitars
 Craig Nielsen – drums

References

2010 albums
Flotsam and Jetsam (band) albums